San Pelayo is a municipality in the Province of Valladolid, Spain.
Population: 54 (based on the data from 2017)
Post code: 47129

Municipalities in the Province of Valladolid